Martha is a 1964 Australian television play. It is a filmed opera directed by Christopher Muir.

Reception
The 2 July 1964 edition of Sydney Morning Herald said "the effortless flow of bright and amiably sentimental music in Flotow's "Martha" made the 90 minutes of this opera pass agreeably enough".

References

Australian television plays
Australian television plays based on operas